Cololejeunea calcarea is a species of liverwort belonging to the family Lejeuneaceae.

It is native to Europe.

References

Lejeuneaceae